Lu Jiajing and You Xiaodi were the defending champions but chose not to participate.

Estelle Cascino and Jessika Ponchet won the title, defeating Alicia Barnett and Olivia Nicholls in the final, 6–4, 6–1.

Seeds

Draw

Draw

References
Main Draw

Engie Open Andrézieux-Bouthéon 42 - Doubles